Julie Elizabeth Agnes Vieusseux née Matthieu (4 August 1820 - 11 March 1878) was an Australian painter, and educator. She was the founder and manager of the Vieusseux Ladies’ College in Melbourne, between 1857 and 1878.

Life
Julie Vieusseux was born in the Netherlands to the Belgian army captain Louis Emile Matthieu and Catherine van de Winkle. She was educated in Paris. In 1849, she married the English civil engineer, architect and surveyor Lewis Vieusseux. Both were of French Huguenot descent. In 1852, she emigrated with her spouse, two sons and her sister to Melbourne in Australia.

Vieusseux established herself as a painter the same year of her arrival in Australia. While her spouse departed for the gold fields, she exhibited her paintings, including at the Victorian Society of Fine Arts in 1857. At the third Victorian Industrial Society Exhibition held in December 1852, Vieusseux was decorated for her art.

In 1857, Vieusseux founded the Vieusseux Ladies’ College. Her school swiftly became a highly fashionable establishment, where the upper classes enrolled their daughters. In 1863, the school had 103 students, an unusually high number for a contemporary Australian school for girls. While successful during the lifetime of Julie Vieusseux the Vieusseux Ladies’ College was swiftly replaced by the Presbyterian Ladies' College after her death, and closed four years after her death.

Further reading 
Marjorie R. Theobald: Knowing Women: Origins of Women's Education in Nineteenth-Century Australia pp. 43-47

References

1820 births
1878 deaths
19th-century Australian businesswomen
19th-century Australian businesspeople
19th-century Australian educators
19th-century Australian painters
19th-century Australian women artists
Belgian emigrants to Australia
Belgian people of French descent